Mallory Park is a motor racing circuit situated in the village of Kirkby Mallory, just off the A47, between Leicester and Hinckley, in central England. Originally used for grass-track until 1955, a new, basically oval hard-surfaced course was constructed for 1956, with a later extension forming a loop with a hairpin bend.

With the car circuit measuring only  it is amongst the shortest permanent race circuits in the UK. Shorter UK circuits are Lydden Hill, Brands Hatch Indy circuit, Scotland's Knockhill and Silverstone's diminutive Stowe circuit.

The Circuit

The circuit has a number of formations, founded on a basic one-mile oval, with the majority of configurations including the northerly extension to the tight, 180° Shaw's Corner. When used without the hairpin-loop, to achieve the shorter-length lap (one mile) configuration, the link section was known as Castrol Chicane.

At the other end of the circuit lies the long right-hand Gerard's Bend. Gerard's is about a third of a mile long and turns through nearly 200°. It was named after local racing hero Bob Gerard, who opened the newly reconstructed circuit on 25 April 1956. Unusually, there are a number of large lakes occupying approximately half of the circuit infield. Despite its short length and Shaw's Corner, also known as The Hairpin, the tightest corner of any UK track, (other than the hairpin on Cadwell Park's short circuit,) Mallory is a fast circuit. To reduce speeds for motorcycle racing a pair of chicanes were introduced, together with a revised exit to Gerard's. Edwina's was added toward the end of the straight following Gerard's, named after former managing director of the circuit Edwina Overend, and the Bus Stop Chicane on the descent to the sweeping left kink, the Devil's Elbow, a blind, downhill, off camber left-hander before the start–finish line on Kirkby Straight. In 2003 a new complex was added toward the end of Gerard's curve. This sequence of bends was designed to reduce speeds on entry to Edwina's, and to prevent motorcycles from colliding as they jockey for position into the chicane. Mallory is the only major oval course remaining in Britain following the closure of Rockingham Motor Speedway.

Mallory Park does not have any true permanent garage facilities, although there are a handful of open garages in the pitlane.

History

Origins – 1950s

The estate at Mallory Park has many historical connections, the oldest being the unique Anglo-Saxons defended moat which is now known as Kirkby Moats, while a Roman road passes through the estate.  Fast forward to the 18th century, when in 1762, Sir Cleoberry Noel became Viscount Wentworth, the title descended on the distaff side. Lord Byron married into the Wentworth family and it is said on his visits to Mallory, he wrote beneath the shade of the Lebanon cedar tree which still stands in the grounds of Kirkby Hall. The last occupant of Kirkby Hall was Herbert Clarkson who died in 1941, when it was sold.

During the Second World War, the circuit started life as Royal Air Force Kirkby Mallory, a satellite landing ground (SLG) and closed in 1947. The hall was a large house which was demolished in 1952, leaving only the stable block and the coach house which now forms the circuit offices, workshops, hotel, pub and restaurant.

The estate of 300 acres was sold by auction in 1953 and was bought by a Mr. Moult of Derby who planned to have horse racing on the disused pony trotting track. Following the war, Mallory became a pony trotting circuit in the late 1940s, which defined the outline of the oval track still in use today. After the financial collapse of the equestrian club responsible for the circuit (Kirkby Mallory Racing Association), the track was hired by various motorcycle clubs for grass track motorcycle and motorcycle sidecar racing.  For example, between September 1949 until 1954, the Leicester Query Motorcycle Club held grass track races. In 1955, the estate was purchased by Clive Wormleighton, under whose influence, the present tarmac was constructed at a cost of £60,000 in 1956. Upon completion of the building work, a circuit test was held on 26 April, when local Grand Prix driver Bob Gerard and Maurice Cann respectively conducted a Cooper-Bristol Formula Two car and a Moto Guzzi motorcycle around the track, Gerard managing an 81 mph lap.

The very first race was held on 29 April, when the Leicester Query Club organised a motorcycle meeting. A large crowd in excess of 20,000 spectators attended the Grand Opening event on 13 May 1956. 248 riders arrived in Leicestershire for this meeting, which saw George Salter set the first lap record at a speed of 84.08 mph, riding a Norton bike. Cars first appeared at the Whit Monday meeting, the event being organised by Peter Fulke Greville of the Nottingham Sports Car Club. The first car race victory went to D. Rees in an Austin.

Many famous racing stars have raced at Mallory over the years, indeed a young John Surtees raced against his father, Jack Surtees. While Jack was a successful grass track racer at Mallory, John went on to be only World Champion on both two and four wheels.

Famous competitors who have raced at Mallory, include John Surtees who won the first ‘Race of the Year’ in 1958. While, the 1960 race, saw Mike Hailwood win and set a new lap record of 89 mph. Both Hailwood and Surtees, along with Jim Clark and Colin Chapman are commemorated with Statues at the front gate. Around this time, Clive Wormleighton added the lakes, which were formed by adding the sluice gate across the Brook.

1960s

Clive Wormleighton continued to run the circuit very successfully until 1962 when ownership passed to Grovewood Securities in July, the previous owner remaining in a consultancy capacity until the end of September. Before this, on 11 June 1962 Mallory Park saw it first non-championship Formula One (International 2000 Guineas) race, won by John Surtees aboard a Lola Mk4 from the privately entered Lotuses of Jack Brabham and Graham Hill. Surtees was now a major race winner at Mallory on both 2 and 4 wheels.

Over the next two years, a considerable amount of money was spent on Mallory with the building of new spectator stands and a new commentators’ press and timekeepers’ boxes. Further developments took place raising the standard of the track. Crowds grew and in 1962, over 50,000 people paid to see the Post TT International Motor Cycle meeting, when Mike Hailwood won, improving the lap record to 91.70 mph. This led to it Race of the Year and Sidecar race of the Year being sponsored by the Daily Mail. Under the control of Peter Fulke Greville, Grovewood Securities, Mallory enjoyed its golden days in the 1960s and 1970s with some of the greatest names in motorsport competing there. Amongst these, a young Austrian who arrived for the Whit Sunday meeting in 1964, for his first race in England in a new Formula Two Brabham – Jochen Rindt. He asked Denny Hulme if he could follow him round to learn the circuit and then proceeded to set fastest time in qualifying; despite being delayed in the race, he finished third behind the reigning World Champion, Jim Clark and his experienced team-mate Peter Arundell.

1970s 

Throughout the Sixties and Seventies, the circuit hosted almost every major British car and bike championship.  However, on occasions there were European Championship events. For example, 12 March 1972, saw FIA European Formula Two Championship, with Dave Morgan winning in his Reeves Racing Brabham-Ford BT35, from the future Ferrari pairing of Niki Lauda and Carlos Reutemann.

1970 saw Mallory used as a venue for cycle racing with the World road race championships being run on a road course starting and finishing at Mallory and incorporating the circuit (reversed) each lap. The professional event was won by ill-fated Belgian Jean-Pierre Monseré.

Formula Two returned again 1973, this time Morgan could only finish third. The victor was Frenchman, Jean-Pierre Jarier in his works March-BMW 732. Second was Dave McConnell.

After a little over 20 years the owners of Mallory Park decided that enough was enough and offered the estate for sale; no doubt the expense of bringing Brands Hatch (which Grovewood also owned) up to current Grand Prix standards had some effort on the decision and the re-opening of Donington Park, which was only some 20 miles away, may have influenced the decision. Whatever the reasons, Mallory was once more on the market but, reportedly with a restriction in its future use for motor sport on its future use for motor racing, although planning permission had been obtained for the erection of 30 dwelling on the estate.

Meanwhile, famously the Bay City Rollers tartan army played a concert during a BBC-organised 'Fun Day' on 18 May 1975, on a stage specifically constructed in the middle of the lake.

1980s and onwards

Edwina Overend was the competitions secretary of the Midlands Centre of the British Racing and Sports Car Club (BRSCC); during the close of the 1982 season, the expected cessation of racing at Mallory loomed large and various time wasters had come and gone, Overend approached Chris Meek with a view to his purchasing the estate. Meek was a well-known racing driver and businessman who effected the purchase late in 1982, and reopened the circuit on 29 May 1983, the first race of the new era being organised by the 750 Motor Club.

In late 1983, the reported owners – Motor Circuit Developments (MCD) announced that the circuit would close due to restriction of usage – being limited to race-days only – meant the circuit was not viable without alternative-use of the track for practice days.

There was no interruption to the programme and Mallory went from strength to strength, apart from a hiccup from in December 1985 when the local borough council served a Noise Nuisance Order which restricted use of the circuit to 40 days a year. On Sundays there is an absolute curfew and no racing engines must be run after 6 pm.

In late 1987, Edwina and Ron Overend trading as Mallory Park (Motorsport) Ltd., negotiated a long term lease with Chris Meek's Titan Properties to ensure the future of racing at Mallory.

Mallory Park has hosted all major motor racing formulae to be contested in post-war England – European Formula Two Championship, British Formula One Championship, Group 7 sport cars, European Formula 5000, British Formula Three Championship and British Saloon Car Championship. In the 1981 programme the name of Damon Hill appears as one of the ‘Ams’ in the Yamaha RD350 Pro-Am series.

The British Superbike Championship was last hosted at Mallory for the 2010 season, where it was used since 1995 (with the exception of 2003).

Annually in October, The Festival of Sidecars takes place. No solo machines compete, but sidecars of all categories are entered, including three-wheelers such as those made by the Morgan Motor Company.

From the mid-1990s, the BRSCC promoted EuroCars, V6 and V8 saloon-outline cars which had graduated from the stock car circuits. At Mallory Park, they ran anticlockwise on the oval circuit.

Records

Two years later, Roy Pike established the first Formula Three  lap in a Titan, which he took round in 48sec.

At this point he was already the lap record holder in the Formula 250 National Superkart class with a laptime of 45.141s, at  set in August 2001.

Lap Records 

The official race lap records at the Mallory Park are listed as:

Other uses

Motocross Circuit

Adjacent to the road course is a purpose-built motocross circuit which played host to the Grand Prix of Great Britain in 2008. The event was being organised by off-road promotions company RHL, who originally planned to use the former Grand Prix circuit at Foxhill, near Swindon, until it became apparent that the infrastructure at the Wiltshire venue would not be sufficient for such a high-profile event.

The event was seen as a success by fans, with over 30,000 fans in attendance over the weekend. However, the Grand Prix only returned once more in 2009.

The circuit has been unused since late 2013 and has fallen into disuse. Motocross activities ended due to noise concerns and, in the interests of improving relations with the local community, the new owners of the circuit have no plans to recommence Motocross.

Cycling
The park is used as a venue for Triathlon training, with the tarmac circuit offering traffic-free conditions for endurance training in cycling and distance-running. The lake enables open water swimming. Occasionally, family cycling fun-events are held.

Major Race Results

British Grasstrack Championship

 Note: Bill who finished second in the 1951 Sidecars went on to complete many laps around Mallory in Road Racing. He is the father of Mick Boddice, the record breaking Isle of Man TT competitor.

Formula One Non-World Championship races

International Formula Two Championship

European Formula 5000 Championship
The BRSCC's European Formula 5000 Championship, organised in the UK but taking in events across Europe, was first contested in 1969. The title sponsorship moved from Guards to Rothmans to Shellsport before the series let in F1, F2 and F. Atlantic cars for 1976.

British Formula Three

British Touring Car Championship

British Superbike Championship

"Race of the Year" (Motorcycles)

FIM Motocross World Championship

Further reading

Gareth Rogers. Mallory Park: 50 Years at the Friendly Circuit. The History Press Ltd. .

Notes

References

External links

 Official website
 https://grasstrackgb.co.uk/honours/domestic-honours/

Motorsport venues in England
Sports venues in Leicestershire